Megaquarium is a business simulation game developed and published in 2018 by Twice Circled.

Gameplay 
Players manage an aquarium.  Based on in-game information, players must determine which kinds of fish can be put in the same tank.  For example, predatory fish must be separated from their prey.  Players also manage technical issues, such as water filtration systems.  Staff, hired by the player, maintain the aquarium.  Staff can not be controlled directly, but they can be given instructions, which they carry out on their own.  Customers must be kept happy, such as by providing them with refreshment, and they do not like seeing filters or other machinery, necessitating hiding it out of view but within a workable distance of the tanks.  Gameplay supports both campaigns, which act as a tutorial, and a sandbox mode.  When zooming in closely, players can experience their aquarium like the customers.

Development 
Megaquarium was released for the PC on September 13, 2018.  It was released on Xbox One, PlayStation 4, and Switch on October 18, 2019.  The Freshwater Frenzy DLC, which includes freshwater animals, was released for PCs on June 4, 2020.  Due to technical issues, the release of the DLC was delayed on consoles until March 2022.

Reception 

Fraser Brown of Rock Paper Shotgun wrote, "It's a breezy, upbeat management game that nonetheless gives you lots to play with and plenty of room for experimentation."  The site later included it in their list of best simulation games for the PC.  Though she said some of the mechanics are a little opaque, Philippa Warr called it a "simple but fun" game.  Bit-Tech called it "a neatly assembled management sim" whose minor annoyances did not stop reviewer Rick Lane from recommending it.  Reviewing the PlayStation 4 port for GameRevolution, Tyler TReese called it a "simplified tycoon sim with a lot of heart" that "delivers what was promised even if it doesn't exceed those promises".  Sammy Barker of Push Square wrote that "the gameplay may seem shallow at first blush, but plunge a little deeper and you’ll find plenty of depth".

References

External links 
 

2018 video games
Windows games
MacOS games
Linux games
Nintendo Switch games
Xbox One games
PlayStation 4 games
Single-player video games
Indie video games
Business simulation games